General John Waldegrave, 3rd Earl Waldegrave (28 April 1718 – 22 October 1784) was a British politician and soldier.

Career
Waldegrave was the youngest son of the 1st Earl Waldegrave. He joined the 1st Regiment of Foot in 1735, rising to the rank of captain in 1739. He became a lieutenant-colonel in the 3rd Regiment of Foot in 1743 and fought in 1745 at the Battle of Fontenoy, where he was wounded, during the War of the Austrian Succession.

He became a member of parliament (MP) for Orford in 1747 and for Newcastle-under-Lyme in 1754. Promoted to major-general in 1757, he took part in the raid on St Malo in June 1758 and the Battle of Minden in August 1759 during the Seven Years' War. He was promoted to lieutenant-general in 1759 and became a Groom of the Bedchamber in 1760. On the death of his elder brother James Waldegrave, 2nd Earl Waldegrave without male heirs in 1763, Waldegrave inherited his titles and estates, including the family seat at Chewton Mendip. He was promoted to full general in 1772 and died in 1784.

Family
On 7 May 1751, he had married Lady Elizabeth Leveson-Gower, a younger daughter of the 1st Earl Gower and they had four children:

George Waldegrave, 4th Earl Waldegrave (1751–1789)
William Waldegrave, 1st Baron Radstock (1753–1825)
Lady Elizabeth Waldegrave (1758–1823)
Lady Caroline Waldegrave (1765–1831)

Ancestry

References

External links
Stirnet: Waldegrave1 

1718 births
1784 deaths
People from Mendip District
Military personnel from Somerset
2nd Dragoon Guards (Queen's Bays) officers
5th Dragoon Guards officers
British Army generals
British Army personnel of the Seven Years' War
British Army personnel of the War of the Austrian Succession
Buffs (Royal East Kent Regiment) officers
Earls Waldegrave
Earls in the Peerage of Great Britain
John Waldegrave, 3rd Earl Waldegrave
Lord-Lieutenants of Essex
Members of the Parliament of Great Britain for Newcastle-under-Lyme
British MPs 1747–1754
British MPs 1754–1761